Events from the year 1753 in Wales.

Incumbents
Lord Lieutenant of North Wales (Lord Lieutenant of Anglesey, Caernarvonshire, Flintshire, Merionethshire, Montgomeryshire) – George Cholmondeley, 3rd Earl of Cholmondeley 
Lord Lieutenant of Glamorgan – Charles Powlett, 3rd Duke of Bolton
Lord Lieutenant of Brecknockshire and Lord Lieutenant of Monmouthshire – Thomas Morgan
Lord Lieutenant of Cardiganshire – Wilmot Vaughan, 3rd Viscount Lisburne
Lord Lieutenant of Carmarthenshire – vacant until 1755
Lord Lieutenant of Denbighshire – Richard Myddelton
Lord Lieutenant of Pembrokeshire – Sir Arthur Owen, 3rd Baronet (until 6 June); Sir William Owen, 4th Baronet (from 2 August)
Lord Lieutenant of Radnorshire – William Perry

Bishop of Bangor – Zachary Pearce
Bishop of Llandaff – Edward Cresset
Bishop of St Asaph – Robert Hay Drummond
Bishop of St Davids – Anthony Ellys (from 31 March)

Events
Lewis Morris is briefly imprisoned at Cardigan when the local squires challenge his rights as the Crown's local representative to mine for lead.  As a result of the controversy, Morris visits London for the first time.
Isaac Wilkinson of Cumbria takes out a lease on the Bersham furnace at Wrexham, and settles at Plas Grono.
William Thomas, former Sheriff of Caernarvonshire, unsuccessfully brings an action in Chancery against Thomas James, Lord Bulkeley, claiming the advowson of Aber.

Arts and literature

New books
Thomas Richards of Coychurch - Antiquæ linguæ Britannicæ thesaurus (English-Welsh dictionary)
William Wogan - Essay on the Proper Lessons of the Church of England

Music
2 July - John Jones succeeds the late Johann Christoph Pepusch as organist at Charterhouse.

Births
2 April - William Lort Mansel, Master of Trinity College, Cambridge (died 1820)
8 October - William Jones, Welsh-descended Governor of Rhode Island (died 1822)
10 December - Richard Thomas, Anglican priest and antiquarian (died 1780)
date unknown 
Christopher Bassett, Methodist clergyman (died 1784)
Henry Davies, Baptist minister (died 1825)

Deaths
6 June - Sir Arthur Owen, 3rd Baronet, MP for Pembroke and Lord Lieutenant of Pembrokeshire
date unknown
Hughe Hughes, Dean of Bangor, about 44
William Gwyn Vaughan, politician, about 72

References

1753 by country
1753 in Great Britain